The 39th Academy of Country Music Awards were held on May 26, 2004 at the Mandalay Bay Resort & Casino, Las Vegas, Nevada. The ceremony was hosted by ACM Award winner, Reba McEntire.

Winners and nominees 
Winners are listed in bold.

References 

Academy of Country Music Awards
Academy of Country Music Awards
Academy of Country Music Awards
Academy of Country Music Awards
Academy of Country Music Awards
Academy of Country Music Awards